Fikret Can Akın (born January 30, 1983) is a Turkish professional basketball coach and former player who played at the point guard position. He is serving as an assistant coach for Türk Telekom of the Turkish Basketbol Süper Ligi (BSL).

External links
 Profile at tblstat.net 
 Profile at tbl.org.tr 

1983 births
Living people
Anadolu Efes S.K. players
Antalya Büyükşehir Belediyesi players
Bandırma B.İ.K. players
Beşiktaş men's basketball players
Galatasaray S.K. (men's basketball) players
İstanbul Büyükşehir Belediyespor basketball players
Point guards
Sakarya BB players
Basketball players from Istanbul
Türk Telekom B.K. players
Turkish men's basketball players